Arzamas Instrument-Building Plant is an instrument-manufacturing company based in Arzamas, Russia. It was established in 1957 and is part of the Russian Arms organization Almaz-Antey.

The plant manufactures gyroscopic instruments, control systems, onboard electronic computers, steering gears, control and verification systems. In the early 1990s, the Arzamas Instrument-Building Production Association had reportedly almost completely converted from production of gyroscopes for military purposes to production of consumer products in four areas: audio equipment, medical equipment, metering devices, and computerized control devices.

References

External links
 Official website

Manufacturing companies of Russia
Companies based in Nizhny Novgorod Oblast
Almaz-Antey
Manufacturing companies established in 1957
Ministry of the Aviation Industry (Soviet Union)
Aerospace companies of the Soviet Union
1957 establishments in Russia
Aircraft component manufacturers of the Soviet Union